Senator Culbertson may refer to:

David B. Culberson (1830–1900), Texas State Senate
Henry N. Culbertson (1860–1943), Wisconsin State Senate
William Wirt Culbertson (1835–1911), Kentucky State Senate

See also
Charles Allen Culberson (1855–1925), U.S. Senator from Texas from 1899 to 1923